is a comical Japanese character, portrayed through the use of a mask. His mouth is puckered and skewed to one side. Some masks have different eye sizes between the left and right eyes. He is often wearing a scarf around his head (usually white with blue dots).

Local dialects transformed it into Hyottoko (ひょっとこ), palatalizing hio to hyo and making the /t/ geminate.

History 

Hyottoko seems to have been a legendary character in Japan in the past, and is now a stock character.

In Iwate Prefecture, there is a myth about the origin of Hyottoko. In the story, there was a boy with a bizarre face who could create gold out of his belly button, so when someone died in a house, you would put the mask of this boy at the top of the fireplace to bring good fortune to the house. The name of the boy was Hyoutokusu (ヒョウトクス). This is considered one of the possible names that lend plausibility to the origin of Hyottoko.

In some parts of north eastern Japan, Hyottoko is regarded as the god of fire. There is a well known folk story in the form of music, izumoyasugibushi (出雲安来節) where a fisherman dances with a bamboo basket, having the same visual expression as the mask of Hyottoko. During this dance, a person puts five yen coins on their nose. This is similar to  myth of Iwate prefecture. Izumo is the old name of Iwate prefecture and Izumo was famous for its iron industry. The dance was part of a dedication for fire and steel. 

Hyottoko also appears in traditional dance dengaku (田楽). He plays the role of a clown. Dancers wearing Hyottoko masks also appear in some Japanese local festivals. One of the most famous Hyottoko dances takes place in Miyazaki Prefecture - Hyuga Hyottoko Natsumatsuri (日向ひょっとこ夏祭り). The Hyotokko dance is believed to originate in the Edo period.

Otafuku 

Its origin might lie in a famous Uzume miko from the Muromachi period who was nicknamed Kamejo ("Turtle Woman") for resembling a traditional turtle mask or okame. She would have received also the nickname of otakufu ("much good fortune") for her goodness and virtue. In posterior centuries, she appears in theatre and literature as Hyottoko's wife.

Over time, the character got associated to ribald humor, and by the time of Zen master Hakuin Ekaku she was identified as a prostitute, ugly but captivating at the same time. This portrayal came probably from the popular stereotype of the meshimori onna, also known as okame, and was used in Zen poetry to reflect the doctrine of nondualism.

References

External links

Netsuke: masterpieces from the Metropolitan Museum of Art, an exhibition catalog from The Metropolitan Museum of Art (fully available online as PDF), which contains many representations of hyottoko.

Japanese legendary creatures
Japanese folk art
Masks in Asia